is a town located in Niigata Prefecture, Japan. , the town had an estimated population of 10,386 in 4490 households, and a population density of 11 persons per km2.

Geography
 
Aga is located in northeastern Niigata Prefecture. Covering 6.8% in area of the entire prefecture, Aga is the third largest municipality in Niigata after Jōetsu and Murakami. The Agano River and its tributary, the Tokonami River, flow through the center of the town.

Surrounding municipalities
Niigata Prefecture
 Shibata
 Agano
 Gosen
 Sanjō
Fukushima Prefecture
 Kitakata
 Tadami
 Nishiaizu
 Kaneyama

Climate
Aga has a Humid climate (Köppen Cfa) characterized by warm, wet summers and cold winters with heavy snowfall.

Demographics
Per Japanese census data, the population of Aga has declined by nearly three-quarters over the past 70 years.

History

The area of present-day Aga was part of ancient Echigo Province, and was part of the territories held by Aizu Domain under the Edo period Tokugawa shogunate. After the Meiji restoration, the area was organised as part of Higashikanbara District, Niigata. The town of Aga was established on April 1, 2005 in a merger of the towns of Kamikawa and Kanose and the villages of Mikawa, and Tsugawa, all from Higashikanbara District.

Government
Aga has a mayor-council form of government with a directly elected mayor and a unicameral town council of 13 members. Aga, together with the city of Gosen contributes two members to the Niigata Prefectural Assembly. In terms of national politics, the town is part of Niigata 11th district of the lower house of the Diet of Japan.

Economy
The local economy is dominated by agriculture. The Kamikawa (上川) area of Aga is particularly famous for its Koshihikari rice, which is also used to make sake in two local breweries, which are also among the main employers of the district. The Mikawa (三川) area is also famous for mushrooms, and is host to a mushroom park where people can either pick their own mushrooms or choose from a wide variety of locally grown produce.

Education
Aga has three public elementary schools and two public middle school operated by the town government. The town has one public high school operated by the Niigata Prefectural Board of Education.

Transportation

Railway
 JR East -  Ban'etsu West Line
 -   -  -  -  -  -

Highway

Local attractions

National Historic Sites
Kosegasawa Cave, Jōmon period archaeological site
Muroya Cave, Jōmon period archaeological site

References

External links 

Official Website 

 
Towns in Niigata Prefecture